In baseball, an unassisted triple play occurs when a defensive player makes all three outs by himself in one continuous play, without his teammates making any assists. Neal Ball was the first to achieve this in Major League Baseball (MLB) under modern rules, doing so on July 19, 1909.  For this rare play to be possible there must be no outs in the inning and at least two runners on base, normally with the runners going on the pitch (e.g., double steal or hit-and-run). An unassisted triple play usually consists of a hard line drive hit directly at an infielder for the first out, with that same fielder then able to double off one of the base runners and tag a second for the second and third outs.

In MLB, a total of fifteen players have fielded an unassisted triple play, making this feat rarer than a perfect game. Of these fifteen players, eight were shortstops, five were second basemen and two were first basemen. The Cleveland Spiders / Cleveland Guardians are the only franchise to have three players achieve the feat while on their roster: Neal Ball, Bill Wambsganss and Asdrúbal Cabrera. The shortest time between two unassisted triple plays occurred in May 1927, when Johnny Neun executed the feat less than 24 hours after Jimmy Cooney. Conversely, it took more than 41 seasons after Neun's play before Ron Hansen performed the feat on July 30, 1968, marking the longest span between unassisted triple plays. The most recent player to make an unassisted triple play is Eric Bruntlett, accomplishing the feat on August 23, 2009. Only Neun and Bruntlett executed unassisted triple plays that ended the game.

Background

Most unassisted triple plays in MLB have taken this form: an infielder catches a line drive (one out), steps on a base to double off a runner (two outs), and then tags another runner on the runner's way to the next base (three outs).  In general, the "next base" is usually the same base that the infielder stepped on to record the second out, and the last runner is tagged before he can return to the previous base. Infrequently, the order of the last two putouts is reversed.

It is nearly impossible for an unassisted triple play to occur unless the fielder is positioned between the two runners.  For this reason, all but two of these plays have been accomplished by middle infielders (second basemen and shortstops). The other two were completed by first basemen, who were able to reach second base before the returning baserunner. For example, after collecting the first two outs, Tigers' first baseman Johnny Neun ignored his shortstop's shouts to throw the ball, and instead ran to second base to get the final out himself. The only unassisted triple play that did not take one of these forms occurred in the 19th century, under rules that are no longer in effect (see below).

It is plausible that a third baseman could complete an unassisted triple play with runners at second and third or with bases loaded, but this has never happened in MLB.  Players in other positions (pitcher, catcher, outfielders) completing an unassisted triple play would require unusual confusion or mistakes by the baserunners, or an atypical defensive alignment (for example, repositioning an outfielder as a fifth infielder).

The unassisted triple play, the perfect game, hitting four home runs in one game and five extra-base hits in a game are thus comparable in terms of rarity, but the perfect game and the home run and extra-base hit records require an extraordinary effort along with a fair amount of luck. By contrast, the unassisted triple play is essentially always a matter of luck: a combination of the right circumstances with the relatively simple effort of catching the ball and running in the right direction with it. Troy Tulowitzki said of his feat, "It fell right in my lap", and as WGN-TV sports anchor Dan Roan commented, "That's the way these plays always happen."

Instances

19th century

Paul Hines, May 8, 1878, Providence Grays (vs. Boston Red Caps) (disputed)
With runners on second and third, center fielder Hines caught a line drive from Jack Burdock that the runners thought was uncatchable. When he caught it, both runners had already passed third (according to The Boston Globe account of the game, printed on May 9). Hines stepped on third, which by the rules of the day meant both runners were out. To make sure, he threw the ball to Charlie Sweasy at second base. It is still debated whether this was truly an unassisted triple play.  Modern rules would have required either the ball to be conveyed to second base to put out the runner who had been on that base and had not tagged up, or that runner to be tagged.  According to the Society for American Baseball Research, the runner coming from second, Ezra Sutton, had not yet touched third base, which would mean that even by 19th-century rules the play was not complete until Hines threw to second, and thus the play was not unassisted.  Ernest J. Lanigan's Baseball Cyclopedia, 1922, which covers professional baseball back to 1876, states on p. 157 that Neal Ball in 1909 was "the first major leaguer to make an unassisted triple play." The Sporting News Baseball Record Book, which covers records back to 1876, likewise does not list Hines' play in the section on unassisted triple plays.

Modern era (in MLB)

 Player is active.

Notes

See also
Walter Carlisle, who executed an unassisted triple play as a minor league outfielder in 1911

References
General

Specific

External links
SABR list of unassisted triple plays
CBS Seattle: Rarest Sports Feats
Video of unassisted triple plays (Morandini's through Bruntlett's)

Baseball terminology
Baseball plays
Sports accomplishments